Rita Behrend is a retired slalom canoeist who competed for East Germany in the late 1950s. She won a gold medal in the mixed C-2 event at the 1959 ICF Canoe Slalom World Championships in Geneva.

References

East German female canoeists
Possibly living people
Year of birth missing (living people)
Medalists at the ICF Canoe Slalom World Championships